Carl José Suneson (born 22 July 1967) is a Spanish professional golfer. He won the 2007 Open de Saint-Omer, his only European Tour success.

Early life and amateur career
Suneson was born in Las Palmas, Gran Canaria to a Swedish father and an English mother. He represented England in amateur competition, and attended Oklahoma State University in the United States, but in 1996 he took Spanish citizenship.

Professional career
Suneson turned professional in 1990. He has played extensively on the European Tour and the second tier Challenge Tour. His best finish on the European Tour Order of Merit through 2008 is 48th in 1996, but he has often had difficulty holding onto his tour card. He has been successful at qualifying school on several occasions, but has dropped down to the Challenge Tour more than once, where he finished on top of the season ending rankings in 1999, also finishing second in 2005.

Suneson had to wait 18 years, until his 256th start before he finally claimed his first European Tour title at the 2007 Open de Saint-Omer. Played during the same week as the U.S. Open, the tournament was dual ranking event with the Challenge Tour, and brought his tally of wins on that tour to six.

Since 2017 Suneson has played a number of events on the European Senior Tour. In January 2020 Seneson gained a place on the 2020 European Senior Tour through Q-school. He gained the fifth and final qualifying place after a three-man playoff, making a birdie at the first extra hole.

Professional wins (6)

European Tour wins (1)

1Dual-ranking event with the Challenge Tour

Challenge Tour wins (6)

1Dual-ranking event with the European Tour

Results in major championships

Note: Suneson only played in The Open Championship.

CUT = missed the half-way cut
"T" = tied

Team appearances
European Amateur Team Championship (representing England): 1989

See also
2005 Challenge Tour graduates
2006 European Tour Qualifying School graduates
2009 European Tour Qualifying School graduates
List of golfers with most Challenge Tour wins

References

External links

Spanish male golfers
Oklahoma State Cowboys golfers
European Tour golfers
Spanish people of Swedish descent
Spanish people of English descent
Sportspeople from Las Palmas
1967 births
Living people
20th-century Spanish people
21st-century Spanish people